The 1908 Tour de France was the 5th edition of Tour de France, one of cycling's Grand Tours. The Tour began in Paris on 13 July and Stage 7 occurred on 25 July with a flat stage to Nîmes. The race finished in Paris on 9 August.

Stage 1
13 July 1908 — Paris to Roubaix,

Stage 2
15 July 1908 — Roubaix to Metz,

Stage 3
17 July 1908 — Metz to Belfort,

Stage 4
19 July 1908 — Belfort to Lyon,

Stage 5
21 July 1908 — Lyon to Grenoble,

Stage 6
23 July 1908 — Grenoble to Nice,

Stage 7
25 July 1908 — Nice to Nîmes,

References

1908 Tour de France
Tour de France stages